Saka municipality was an administrative territorial entity of the Liepāja District, Latvia (2004 - 2009). Since the 2009 administrative reforms it has been in Pāvilosta municipality.

See also 
Administrative divisions of Latvia before 2009

Former municipalities of Latvia